Pablo Aranda may refer to:

 Pablo Aranda (footballer) (born 2001), Argentine right-back
 Pablo Aranda (writer) (1968–2020), Spanish writer